The Friedrichsfelde Central Cemetery is a cemetery in the borough of Lichtenberg in Berlin. It was the cemetery used for many of Berlin's Socialists, Communists, and anti-fascist fighters.

History 
When the cemetery was founded in 1881 it was called the Friedrichsfelde Municipal Cemetery Berlin. In 1900, with the burial of Wilhelm Liebknecht, founder of the Social Democratic Party (SPD), the cemetery became the resting place for many of the leaders and activists of Germany's social democratic, socialist and communist movements. In 1919, the coffins of Karl Liebknecht and Rosa Luxemburg, co-founders of the Communist Party of Germany were buried in a mass grave in a remote section of the cemetery. A 2009 Charité autopsy report however cast doubt on whether Rosa Luxemberg's remains were ever buried there.

The division of Berlin following the Second World War caused the cemetery to be within the borders of East Berlin, where it was used to bury East German (GDR) leaders, such as Walter Ulbricht and Wilhelm Pieck, the first President of the GDR.

Zentralfriedhof Friedrichsfelde as "Socialist Cemetery"

The 1926 Monument to the Revolution 

Unveiled in 1926, the Monument to the Revolution was erected in front of the mass grave where the coffins of Karl Liebknecht and Rosa Luxemburg had been interred in 1919.

The 1951 Memorial to the Socialists

The current Memorial to the Socialists stands close to the cemetery's main gate and was inaugurated by Wilhelm Pieck in 1951. Although constructed at a significant distance from the site once occupied by the 1926 Monument to the Revolution, the 1951 memorial was planned as its "moral successor" and as central memorial site for East Germany's Socialists, Communists and anti-fascist fighters. Until 1989, decisions whether a person should be buried in the Memorial to the Socialists or the adjacent Pergolenweg section of the cemetery rested solely with the Politburo of the Socialist Unity Party of Germany, and many honoured this way were also given a state funeral.

The 1951 Memorial to the Socialists consists of a central garden roundel surrounded by a semi-circular brick wall. The central garden roundel is dominated by a porphyry stele or obelisk with the words Die Toten mahnen uns, which is surrounded by 10 graves commemorating foremost socialist leaders, namely: Karl Liebknecht, Rosa Luxemburg, Ernst Thälmann, Wilhelm Pieck, Walter Ulbricht, Franz Mehring, John Schehr, Rudolf Breitscheid, and Otto Grotewohl. Into the semi-circular brick wall are set gravestones and niches containing the urns of distinguished Socialists and Communists. Also in the semi-circular brick wall is a large red marble tablet recording the names of 327 men and women who gave their lives in the cause of fighting Fascism between 1933 and 1945. Included in the list are Hans Coppi, Hilde Coppi, Heinrich Koenen, Arvid Harnack, Harro Schulze-Boysen, John Sieg, and Ilse Stöbe.

Immediately behind the semi-circular brick wall of the Memorial to the Socialists lies the Pergolenweg section of the cemetery. Here are buried the urns of Socialists, Communists and anti-fascist fighters of merit who were considered distinguished enough by the Politburo of the Socialist Unity Party of Germany to rest in the vicinity of the foremost party leaders yet not as eminent as to entitle them to a grave in the Memorial to the Socialists  itself. People buried in the Pergolenweg section could also have the urns of up to three family members buried with them.

Notable interments (selection)

Memorial to the Socialists
 Willi Bredel (1901–1964)
 Rudolf Breitscheid (1874–1944)
 Otto Grotewohl (1894–1964)
 Hugo Haase (1863–1919)
 Katharina Kern (1900–1985)
  (1888–1942)
 Carl Legien (1861–1920)
 Theodor Leipart (1867–1947)
 Karl Liebknecht (1871–1919)
 Rosa Luxemburg (1871–1919)
 Franz Mehring (1846–1919)
 Heinrich Rau (1899–1961)
 John Schehr (1896–1934)
 Rudolf Schwarz (1904–1934)
 Paul Singer (1844–1911)
 Ernst Thälmann (1886–1944) (cenotaph)
 Walter Ulbricht (1893–1973)
 Erich Weinert (1890–1953)
 Friedrich Wolf (1888–1953)

Pergolenweg section
 Klaus Fuchs (1911–1988), theoretical physicist and atomic spy
 Adolf Hennecke (1905–1975)
 Greta Kuckhoff (1902–1981)
 Hans Marchwitza  (1890–1965)
 Konrad Wolf (1925–1982)
 Markus Wolf (1923–2006)
 Ernst Wollweber (1898–1967)

Other sections of the cemetery
 Friedrich Simon Archenhold (1861–1939)
 Käthe Kollwitz (1867–1945)
 Paul Friedrich Meyerheim (1842–1915)
 Erich Mielke (1907–2000)
 Otto Nagel (1894–1967)
 Ludwig Renn (1889–1979)
 F. C. Weiskopf (1900–1955)
 Walter Womacka (1925–2010)

References

External links 

  Élise Julien, Elsa Vonau: "The Friedrichsfelde Cemetery: the Construction of a Socialist Space (from the 1880s to the 1970s)", in Le Mouvement Social Volume 237, Issue 4, 2011 (online)

East Berlin
Cemeteries in Berlin
Buildings and structures in Lichtenberg
1881 establishments in Germany